Zinken's tiger (Parantica albata) is a species of nymphalid butterfly, endemic to Indonesia.

References

Parantica
Butterflies of Indonesia
Endemic fauna of Indonesia
Butterflies described in 1831
Taxonomy articles created by Polbot